Fio da Memória (2016), is Brazilian singer-songwriter Luísa Maita's second album on the independent label Cumbancha, following Lero-Lero in 2010. Maita explained that in her new album, “I wanted to revisit the Brazilian rhythms and other sounds that I have heard growing up from a contemporary, electronic and urban perspective.”

Track listing

References 

2016 albums
Luísa Maita albums